Ben Carter (February 10, 1910/1907 – December 12, 1946) was an American actor and casting agent. He appeared in numerous Hollywood feature films including The Harvey Girls, Dixie Jamboree, and Born to Sing.

Early life
Carter was born in Fairfield, Iowa. His father was a barber and his mother was a housemaid. He graduated from high school in Aurora, Illinois.

Career
Carter headed to Los Angeles to work in movies. As a booking agent he focused on African American performers in New York City and Los Angeles. He was one of the first African American performers to land a seven-year contract at 20th Century-Fox. He opened his agency office in 1935.

Carter appeared in Gone With the Wind (1939) as well as casting all the other African American actors and actresses in it, Maryland (1940) and Tin Pan Alley (1940). Carter often performed in comic roles and in scenes which allowed him to display his singing ability such as in The Harvey Girls (1946) and A Day at the Races (1937). Among his most prominent roles were in the Charlie Chan movies The Scarlet Clue (1945) and Dark Alibi (1946).  A notable role of his was in the World War II movie Crash Dive (1943) where his character rises above racial stereotypes and is portrayed as an valuable member of a submarine's crew.

Personal life
Carter was a member of the Hollywood Victory Committee and was a civil rights activist.

He resided at 2133 S. Harvard Blvd. in Sugar Hill (now "West Adams"), Los Angeles, California, in 1942.

Carter suffered from diphtheria. He died of the disease on December 12, 1946, in New York City.

Filmography

Notes

External links

20th-century births
1946 deaths
Year of birth uncertain
American male film actors
20th-century American male actors
Male actors from Iowa
American talent agents
Infectious disease deaths in New York (state)
Respiratory disease deaths in New York (state)
Deaths from diphtheria
African-American male actors
20th-century American businesspeople
People from West Adams, Los Angeles
People from Fairfield, Iowa
20th-century African-American people